The 2003 Formula Renault V6 Eurocup season began on April, 5 at Circuit de Catalunya. 2003 was the first season of this championship created by Renault as a support series in Eurosport's Super Racing Weekends (ETCC and FIA GT Championship). The titles went to Argentinian driver José María López and French team ARTA-Signature.

Entry List

Race calendar and results
31 March and 2 April were test days for all drivers and teams at the circuits of Circuito de Albacete and Circuit de Catalunya in Spain.

Championship standings
Points are awarded in both race as following : 30, 24, 20, 14, 10, 8, 6, 4, 2 and 2 bonus points for pole position and also for the fasted lap in each race.
French Grand Race must be stopped. The half of the points are awarded for this race.

Drivers

 † Driver did not finish but was classified, having completed more than 90% of race distance.

Teams

 † Driver did not finish but was classified, having completed more than 90% of race distance.

References

External links
 Speedsportmag.com, results, entry list, calendar.
 Nuvolari3000.com , results.
 renault-sport.com, official web site of the series.

Renault V6 Eurocup season 2003
Formula Renault V6 Eurocup seasons
2003 in European sport
Renault V6 Eurocup